Oscar Sundh (born October 22, 1986, in Uppsala, Sweden) is a Swedish former professional ice hockey forward, who played in the Swedish Hockey League (SHL).

Playing career 
In 2006, Sundh signed with Timrå IK for one year. However, in September the same year, during the 2006–07 preseason, his contract was extended to 2007–08. The following month, he was named the first in the line of four candidates for Elitserien Rookie of the Year 2007. The award was eventually won by the forward Patric Hörnqvist.

After three seasons with Timrå IK, Sundh signed a two-year deal with HV71.

Career statistics

Regular season and playoffs

International

Awards and honors

References

External links 

1986 births
Almtuna IS players
Djurgårdens IF Hockey players
HV71 players
Linköping HC players
Living people
Luleå HF players
IK Oskarshamn players
St. John's Fog Devils players
Swedish ice hockey right wingers
Timrå IK players
Sportspeople from Uppsala